Bağözü is a village in the Dargeçit District of Mardin Province in Turkey. The village is populated by Kurds of the Erebiyan tribe and had a population of 148 in 2021.

References 

Villages in Dargeçit District
Kurdish settlements in Mardin Province